Alsing is a given name and surname. Notable people with the name include:

Given name
Alsing Andersen (1893–1962), Danish politician
Peter Alsing Nielsen (1907–1985), Danish painter
Christoffer Alsing* (1997), IT-geni

Surname
Adam Alsing (1968–2020),  Swedish television and radio presenter
Olle Alsing (born 1996), Swedish ice hockey player